Deuterocohnia digitata is a plant species in the genus Deuterocohnia. This species is native to Bolivia.

References

digitata
Flora of Bolivia